John Woods is an English former professional rugby league footballer who played in the 1970s, 1980s and 1990s, and coached in the 1980s.

Playing career

International honours
John Woods won caps for England while at Leigh in 1979 against Wales (interchange/substitute), and France, in 1980 against Wales (interchange/substitute), and France, in 1981 against France, Wales, and Wales (interchange/substitute), and won caps for Great Britain while at Leigh in 1979 against Australia (3 matches), and New Zealand, in 1980 against New Zealand, in 1981 against France (2 matches), in 1982 against Australia, and Australia (interchange/substitute), in 1983 against France, and while at Warrington in 1987 against Papua New Guinea.

County Cup Final appearances
John Woods played , and scored 2-goals in Leigh's 8-3 victory over Widnes in the 1981 Lancashire County Cup Final during the 1981–82 season at Central Park, Wigan on Saturday 26 September 1981, and played , and scored 2-goals in Warrington's 16-28 defeat by Wigan in the 1987 Lancashire County Cup Final during the 1987–88 season at Knowsley Road, St. Helens on Sunday 11 October 1987.

BBC2 Floodlit Trophy Final appearances
John Woods played left-, i.e. number 4, in Leigh's 4-12 defeat by Castleford in the 1976 BBC2 Floodlit Trophy Final during the 1976–77 season at Hilton Park, Leigh on Tuesday 14 December 1976.

Career records
John Woods holds Leigh's "Most Career Points" record with 2,492 points,.  With 3,985-points he is sixth on British rugby league's "most points in a career" record list behind Neil Fox, Jim Sullivan, Kevin Sinfield, Gus Risman and Danny Brough.

Testimonial match
John Woods' Testimonial match at Leigh took place in 1984.

References

External links
(archived by web.archive.org) Lions beat the Blues
Warrington's World Cup heroes - John Woods
Photograph "John Woods - John Woods signed for Northern from Leigh in 1985. He scored 421 points in 62 games for the club. - Date: 01/01/1985" at rlhp.co.uk
Statistics at wolvesplayers.thisiswarrington.co.uk

1956 births
Living people
Bradford Bulls players
England national rugby league team players
English rugby league coaches
English rugby league players
Great Britain national rugby league team players
Lancashire rugby league team players
Leigh Leopards captains
Leigh Leopards coaches
Leigh Leopards players
Place of birth missing (living people)
Rochdale Hornets players
Rugby league centres
Rugby league five-eighths
Rugby league fullbacks
Rugby league players from Leigh, Greater Manchester
Warrington Wolves players